Aasmaan is a 1984 Bollywood movie starring Rajiv Kapoor, Tina Munim, Divya Rana and Mala Sinha. It was directed by Tony Juneja. Rajiv Kapoor plays a double role in the film as Kumar ( as positive character) and lookalike Chandan Singh ( as villain character).

Cast
 Rajiv Kapoor
 Tina Munim
 Divya Rana
 Mala Sinha
 Sharat Saxena

Music
"Ban Ke Nazar Dil Ki Zubaan, Kehne Lagi Ik Dastaan", sung by Kishore Kumar, is an evergreen classic.

Lyrics: Anand Bakshi

References

External links

1984 films
1980s Hindi-language films
Films scored by Anu Malik